Liga ASOBAL 1992–93 season was the third since its establishment. The league was played in a two phases. In the first phase, a total of 16 teams were separate in two groups of eight teams. The first five of every groups passed to the second phase for the title. The last three passed to the second phase for the permanence in Liga ASOBAL.

First phase

Group A

Group B

Second phase

Group I

Championship playoffs qualifying round

Granollers & Arcos Valladolid won the qualifying round and advanced to quarterfinals.

Championship playoffs

Group II

Mepamsa San Antonio was relegated to Primera División Nacional due to financial troubles.
Later, Caserío Vigón became BM Ciudad Real and remained in Liga ASOBAL due to vacant seats.

In–Out promotion

1st leg

2nd leg

Alicante-Benidorm & Sociedad Conquense remained in Liga ASOBAL. But Alicante-Benidorm is finally dissolved, so that JD Arrate is promoted.

Top goal scorers

1992-93
handball
handball
Spain